Spodoptera androgea, the androgea armyworm moth, is a species of cutworm or dart moth in the family Noctuidae. It is found in North America.

The MONA or Hodges number for Spodoptera androgea is 9671.1.

References

Further reading

External links

 

Spodoptera
Articles created by Qbugbot
Moths described in 1780